Mike Peter Delany (born 15 June 1982) is a retired New Zealand rugby union player who last played for the  in Super Rugby and  in the Mitre 10 Cup.

Delany plays at fly-half but can also cover fullback. Delany was chosen as one of 4 new caps to the New Zealand team for their End of Year of tour of 2009, playing one match on the tour. In 2011 he signed for the Panasonic Wild Knights. In 2012, due to injuries to both starting and back up five-eighths Colin Slade and Lima Sopoaga for the Highlanders, Delany signed with his former team to fill the position until they returned. Whilst still under contract with the Panasonic Wild Knights, he played on loan at Clermont Auvergne, but signed a two-year deal with the French club in April 2013. On 19 February 2015, Delany travelled to England to join Newcastle Falcons in the Aviva Premiership on a three-year deal. In 2017, Delany returned to New Zealand to play for Bay of Plenty. Following a great performance during the 2017 Mitre 10 Cup, he signed with the Crusaders for the 2018 Super Rugby season. He made 5 appearances for the Crusaders en route to the club winning their ninth title. This was Delany's first title at the professional level. He retired at the conclusion of the 2018 Mitre 10 Cup.

References

External links
Newcastle Falcons Profile

1982 births
Bay of Plenty rugby union players
Saitama Wild Knights players
Highlanders (rugby union) players
Chiefs (rugby union) players
ASM Clermont Auvergne players
Living people
New Zealand international rugby union players
New Zealand rugby union players
Rugby union players from Rotorua
New Zealand expatriate rugby union players
Expatriate rugby union players in Japan
Expatriate rugby union players in France
New Zealand expatriate sportspeople in Japan
New Zealand expatriate sportspeople in France
Rugby union fly-halves
People educated at Rotorua Boys' High School